John Anderson 2 is the second studio album by American country music artist John Anderson. It was released in 1981 under Warner Bros. Records. The album includes the singles "I'm Just an Old Chunk of Coal"and "Chicken Truck."

Track listing

Personnel
Background Vocals: Ronnie Drake, Beckie Foster, Allen Henson, Joy Gardner, Ima Withers
Bass guitar: Henry Strzelecki
Dobro: Pete Drake
Drums: Jerry Carrigan
Fiddle: Michael Kott, Buddy Spicher
Guitar: Harold Bradley, Fred Carter Jr., Jerry Reed, Pete Wade
Lead Vocals: John Anderson
Organ: Mike Jordan
Piano: Mike Jordan, Hargus "Pig" Robbins
Steel Guitar: Pete Drake
Upright Bass: Bob Moore

Chart performance

References

John Anderson (musician) albums
1981 albums
Warner Records albums
Albums produced by Norro Wilson